Octaoxygen, also known as boxygen, ε-oxygen or red oxygen, is an allotrope of oxygen consisting of eight oxygen atoms. This allotrope forms above  at pressures greater than 17 GPa.

Preparation and properties 
As the pressure of oxygen at room temperature is increased through , it undergoes a dramatic phase transition to a different allotrope. Its volume decreases significantly, and it changes color from sky-blue to deep red. This ε-phase was discovered in 1979, but the structure has been unclear.  Based on infrared spectroscopy, researchers assumed in 1999 that this phase consists of  molecules in a crystal lattice. However, in 2006, it was shown by X-ray crystallography that this stable phase is in fact . No one predicted the structure theoretically: a rhomboid  cluster consisting of four  molecules.

In this phase, it exhibits a dark-red color, very strong infrared absorption, and a magnetic collapse. It is also stable over a very large pressure domain and has been the subject of numerous X-ray diffraction, spectroscopic and theoretical studies. It has been shown to have a monoclinic C2/m symmetry, and its infrared absorption behaviour was attributed to the association of oxygen molecules into larger units. At 11 GPa, the intra-cluster bond length of the  cluster is 0.234 nm, and the inter-cluster distance is 0.266 nm, both longer than the 0.120 nm bond-length in the oxygen molecule .

The formation mechanism of the  cluster found in the work is not clear yet, and the researchers think that the charge transfer between oxygen molecules or the magnetic moment of oxygen molecules has a significant role in the formation.

Potential applications 
Liquid oxygen is already used as an oxidant in rockets, and it has been speculated that red oxygen could make an even better oxidant, because of its higher energy density.

Researchers think that this structure may greatly influence the structural investigation of elements.

References 

Allotropes of oxygen
Substances discovered in the 1970s